Dean Jackson Wade (born November 20, 1996) is an American professional basketball player for the Cleveland Cavaliers of the National Basketball Association (NBA). He played college basketball for the Kansas State Wildcats.

Early life
Wade was born in Wichita, Kansas to Jay and Trish Wade. He lived in Inman, Kansas briefly before moving to St. John at a young age. His mother is a track and volleyball coach at St. John High School in St. John, Kansas, where she led the volleyball team to three state championships. His father was briefly a member of the football team at Kansas State University.

High school career
Wade played four years of varsity basketball at St. John High School in St. John, Kansas, earning All-State honors for multiple seasons and winning three state championships. As a senior, he was named Parade All-American, along with 29 other players in his class. He was also selected as Mr. Kansas Basketball by the Kansas Basketball Coaches Association (KBCA).

College career
Wade was named to the Big 12 All-Newcomer Team at the conclusion of his freshman season at Kansas State. As a sophomore, he averaged 9.3 points, 4.5 rebounds, and 1.8 assists per game. After a breakout junior season, Wade earned first-team All-Big 12 accolades. Wade averaged 16.2 points and 6.2 rebounds per game as a junior. As a senior, Wade averaged 12.9 points and a team-high 6.2 rebounds per game and was named to the first-team All-Big 12. His season was cut short by a foot injury.

Professional career

Cleveland Cavaliers (2019–present)

2019–20 season 

On July 9, 2019, Wade signed a two-way contract with the Cleveland Cavaliers after going undrafted in the 2019 NBA draft. On November 18, Wade made his NBA debut against the New York Knicks, he went scoreless but logged one steal in eight minutes of action. Wade only played 12 games with the Cavaliers during his rookie season, averaging 1.7 points and 1.6 rebounds in six minutes of play. He spent most of the season with the Cavaliers' G League affiliate, the Canton Charge. In the G League, Wade started in 29 of 30 games, averaging 14.2 points, 7.6 rebounds, 2.3 assists and 1.4 blocks in 31.1 minutes while shooting 46.1% from the field and 39.9% from 3-point range.

2020–21 season 

On July 2, 2020, Wade signed a multi-year deal with the Cavaliers. 

On February 23, 2021, Wade made his first NBA career start, logging five points, two rebounds and two assists across 20 minutes in a 112–111 win over the Atlanta Hawks. Four days later, Wade scored six points and grabbed a career-high 12 rebounds in 27 minutes of action in a 112–109 victory against the Philadelphia 76ers. On March 3, Wade scored a then career-high 17 points, knocking down five 3-pointers to go along with six rebounds, two assists and one steal across 31 minutes of play in a 114–111 loss to the Indiana Pacers. On April 11, Wade scored a career-high 21 points on 8-of-12 field goal shooting and 5-of-8 from three, in addition to six rebounds, two assists and a game-high three steals in 31 minutes of action in a 116–109 loss to the New Orleans Pelicans. On May 10, Wade logged his first career double-double with 19 points and a career-high tying 12 rebounds in a 111–102 loss to the Indiana Pacers.

2021–22 season 

After Lauri Markkanen entered the NBA's COVID-19 health and safety protocols, Wade became the starter at the small forward position. On November 18, 2021, Wade logged 17 points on 7-of-13 shooting from the field and 3-of-6 from three, along with nine rebounds and a career-high five assists across a career-high 40 minutes of play in a 104–89 loss to the Golden State Warriors. On December 15, Wade posted his second career double-double with 16 points and 10 rebounds in a 124–89 win over the Houston Rockets. With Markkanen being sidelined due to a sprained ankle he sustained in a game against the Oklahoma City Thunder on January 22, 2022, Wade returned to the starting lineup. On March 28, he was ruled out for the remainder of the season after undergoing surgery on a torn meniscus in his right knee which he sustained on March 12 in a game in Chicago.

2022–23 season 
On June 22, the Cavaliers announced they exercised their fourth-year team option on Wade, keeping him with the team for another season. On September 26, Wade signed a multi-year contract extension with the team.

Career statistics

NBA

Regular season

|-
| style="text-align:left;"|
| style="text-align:left;"|Cleveland
| 12 || 0 || 5.9 || .692 || .500 || .000 || 1.6 || .2 || .2 || .3 || 1.7
|- 
| style="text-align:left;"|
| style="text-align:left;"|Cleveland
| 63 || 19 || 19.2 || .431 || .366 || .769 || 3.4 || 1.2 || .6 || .3 || 6.0
|-
| style="text-align:left;"|
| style="text-align:left;"|Cleveland
| 51 || 28 || 19.2 || .456 || .359 || .667 || 2.9 || 1.0 || .6 || .1 || 5.3
|- class="sortbottom"
| style="text-align:center;" colspan="2"|Career
| 126 || 47 || 18.0 || .447 || .365 || .714 || 3.0 || 1.0 || .5 || .3 || 5.3

College

|-
| style="text-align:left;"| 2015–16
| style="text-align:left;"| Kansas State
| 33 || 31 || 26.4 || .434 || .292 || .656 || 5.1 || 1.1 || .6 || .5 || 9.9
|-
| style="text-align:left;"| 2016–17 
| style="text-align:left;"| Kansas State
| 35 || 35 || 28.0 || .496 || .402 || .663 || 4.5 || 1.8 || .7 || .7 || 9.3
|-
| style="text-align:left;"| 2017–18 
| style="text-align:left;"| Kansas State 
| 33 || 32 || 32.8 || .550 || .440 || .752 || 6.2 || 2.7 || 1.5 || .8 || 16.2
|-
| style="text-align:left;"| 2018–19
| style="text-align:left;"| Kansas State
| 25 || 25 || 30.4 || .492 || .418 || .789 || 6.2 || 2.8 || .8 || .5 || 12.9
|- class="sortbottom"
| style="text-align:center;" colspan="2"| Career
| 126 || 123 || 29.3 || .498 || .386 || .711 || 5.4 || 2.1 || .9 || .6 || 12.0

Personal life 
Wade graduated with a bachelor’s degree in social science.

References

External links

Kansas State Wildcats bio

1996 births
Living people
American men's basketball players
Basketball players from Wichita, Kansas
Canton Charge players
Cleveland Cavaliers players
Kansas State Wildcats men's basketball players
Parade High School All-Americans (boys' basketball)
Power forwards (basketball)
Undrafted National Basketball Association players